Pusch Ridge is the most prominent feature in the Pusch Ridge Wilderness Area of the Santa Catalina Mountains, managed by the Coronado National Forest north of Tucson, Arizona, in the United States.

History
Pusch Ridge was named after pioneer George Pusch (1847–1921), who came to Arizona from Germany in the 1870s, and established the Steam Pump Ranch on the Cañada del Oro near the base of the ridge in 1874 in what is now the town of Oro Valley.  Steam Pump Ranch was one of the largest cattle ranches in the Territory of Arizona.  George Pusch also served as a state legislator and one of the delegates to the original Arizona Constitutional Convention in 1910.

Peaks
Pusch Ridge is primarily made up of three distinct peaks, including (from southwest to northeast in orientation) Pusch Peak, Bighorn Mountain, and Table Mountain.

Wildlife and environment
Pusch Ridge was home to one of the last populations of Desert Bighorn Sheep in Arizona, none have been observed since 2005.  In a controversial effort to re-establish the Bighorn Sheep population, on November 18, 2013 thirty-one Bighorns were released by Arizona Game and Fish officers near Pusch Ridge, the first in a series of three planned releases totaling about 100 animals over the next two years. Pusch Ridge is noted for dramatic ridges, deep canyons, and extensive biodiversity in elevation changes.  Pusch Ridge also provides sweeping views of Oro Valley to the west, and Tucson to the south.
On June 5, 2020 prior to midnight a thunderstorm produced lightning that ignited a brush fire on the Bighorn Peak burning approximately 40 acres within 12 hours. Helicopters were deployed to drop water on the fire. The Bighorn Fire continued to spread through the Catalinas and ended up becoming one of the largest wildfires in Arizona history.

Trailhead
The Pusch Ridge Trailhead is located within the town of Oro Valley, accessed from East Linda Vista Boulevard just east of North Oracle Road (State Route 77) (formerly U.S. 89), six miles north of Tucson.  Restrictions on hiking Pusch Ridge apply during certain times due to the potential impact on the breeding activities of the Bighorn Sheep in the area.

References

External links
 "Coronado National Forest".
 "Pusch Wilderness". U.S. Forest Service.

Ridges of Arizona
Santa Catalina Mountains
Landforms of Pima County, Arizona